Sergey Mikhailovich Bragin (1894 — 1965) was a Russian scientist and a specialist in the field of electrical engineering, Professor, Doctor of Technical Sciences and a laureate of USSR State Prize.

Biography 
Sergey Mikhailovich Bragin was born in 1894. He graduated from Leningrad Electrotechnical Institute (now St. Petersburg State Electrotechnical University). Since 1922 he worked at Sevkabel plant in Leningrad and at the same time was as a lecturer at Leningrad Electrotechnical Institute. In 1932 he was appointed chief engineer of Soyuzkabel Trust in Moscow. From 1933 to 1938 he was Deputy director for technical part at Moskabel plant, and then — Chief of the Cable department of the Glavtsvetmetobrabotka Trust.

In 1939 he was appointed head of the newly established Cable Technology Department at the Faculty of Electrical Materials of Moscow Power Engineering Institute. Just before his appointment Sergey Bragin was awarded Stalin Prize for his scientific work. He headed the department until 1961, which under his leadership prepared hundreds of Soviet engineers. During World War II he was awarded the Order of the Red Star for his merits in the field of science.

Sergei Mikhailovich Bragin was the author of numerous scientific works, including "Electrical and thermal calculation of the cable" (1960) and "Electrical cable" (1955).

He died in 1965 and was buried at Cherkizovskoe Cemetery in Moscow.

References 

Academic staff of Moscow Power Engineering Institute
Saint Petersburg Electrotechnical University alumni
1894 births
1965 deaths
Engineers from Moscow
Stalin Prize winners